Manvir Singh (born 6 November 1995) is an Indian professional footballer who plays as a forward for Indian Super League club ATK Mohun Bagan and the India national team.

Club career

Youth career and early career: 2015–17 
Manvir did his youth career in the Minerva Academy FC (current Punjab FC). He signed his first professional contract with the senior team of Minerva Academy and represented them in the 2015–16 I-League 2nd Division. After his one year tenure with Minerva, Manvir signed for Mohammedan SC for the 2016–17 I-League 2nd Division. He left Mohammedan SC and played his rest of the 2016–17 season with Southern Samity. While playing for Southern Samity, Manvir got his national call-up for the India U23 team to take part in the 2018 AFC U-23 Championship qualifiers. On 26 March 2017, Manvir scored the winning goal in the 2017 Santosh Trophy Final for West Bengal against Goa, which resulted in their 0–1 victory in the final.

FC Goa: 2017–2020 
On 28 July 2017, it was announced that Manvir had signed a contract with Indian Super League club FC Goa. He made his debut for the club in the 2017–18 Indian Super League season as a substitute for Manuel Lanzarote against Chennaiyin FC on 19 November 2017, which they won 2–3. He ended his 2017–18 ISL season goalless. Manvir played his first match of the 2018–19 Indian Super League season on 1 October 2018 in a 2–2 draw against NorthEast United FC, where he started as a substitute for Mandar Rao Desai. He scored his debut goal on 11 November in the match against Kerala Blasters FC, where he scored the last goal for Goa, as they won the match 1–3 at full-time. Goa had a standout season once again, and went on to qualify for the 2019 Indian Super League Final. Manvir started as a substitute for Jackichand Singh in the final against Bengaluru FC on 17 March 2019, which they lost 0–1 at extra-time, after Bengaluru found their vital goal in the last moments of the game. Manvir netted his first of the 2019–20 Indian Super League season on 1 November 2019 against NorthEast United, where he scored the equalizing goal in the injury time, that resulted in the match going to a 2–2 draw. He scored his second of the season against Hyderabad FC on 8 December, where he scored the only goal by coming in as a substitute for Seiminlen Doungel, as the match ended 0–1 to Goa. Manvir started as a substitute for Seiminlen Doungel in the match against Jamshedpur FC on 19 February 2020, which they won 0–5. This match was the last match of FC Goa before knockout stages, and they were awarded with ISL League Winners Shield for finishing as table toppers of the season. Thus, Manvir won his first club silverware with FC Goa on a historic event. Goa qualified for the knockout stages of the ISL once again and met Chennaiyin on both legs. Manvir started in the first leg as a lineup starter, and started in the second leg as a substitute. Both legs of the semi-final were high scoring matches, and FC Goa was knocked out by Chennaiyin by an aggregate score of 6–5. He was also a part of the FC Goa team that won the 2019 Indian Super Cup. After the 2019–20 ISL season, Manvir left FC Goa after a three-year stay for ATK Mohun Bagan.

ATK Mohun Bagan: 2020–present

2020–21 ISL season 
On 25 August 2020, it was announced that ATK Mohun Bagan had secured Manvir Singh under a three-year contract. After negotiating a transfer fee with FC Goa, it was declared by the Gaurs as their biggest transfer fee received by the club for a player till the date. His transfer fee closed by ATK Mohun Bagan is the third highest fee paid for an Indian player by any club in the history of Indian football. He made his debut for the club in the opening match of the 2020–21 Indian Super League season against Kerala Blasters on 20 November 2020, which ended 0–1 to ATK Mohun Bagan. He scored his debut goal for the club against fierce rivals SC East Bengal on 27 November, which they won 0–2 at full-time. Manvir found the net again on 11 December in the match against Hyderabad, which concluded in a 1–1 draw. He scored a brace against Odisha FC on 6 February 2021, where he opened the score-sheet, and also found the net when the match was in the event of deadlock, that resulted in a 1–4 victory for ATKMB. Manvir scored his fifth goal of the season on 22 February against Hyderabad in the second match against them that season, which ended in a 2–2 draw, after he restored the draw in the beginning. After ATK Mohun Bagan qualified for the playoffs and met NorthEast United in both legs, Manvir scored in the second leg against them on 9 March, which ended 2–1 to ATK Mohun Bagan. His goal was a vital goal that helped ATKMB to progress through to the final of the 2020–21 ISL season, after an aggregate win of 3–2 from both legs. Manvir started in the final against Mumbai City FC on 13 March 2021, which they lost 2–1 after Mumbai City found their all important goal in the last minute of the match.

International career 
Manvir represented India U23, when he was called up to squad for the 2018 AFC U-23 Championship qualifiers. He played all three group stage matches for India against Syria, Qatar, and Turkmenistan respectively. He scored his debut goal for the under-23 team in the match against Turkmenistan on 23 July 2017, where he scored the equalizing goal, as India made a comeback and defeat them with a score of 3–1. Manvir made a total of 3 appearances for the under-23 team, and was called-up for the senior national team along with many under-23 players by Stephen Constantine.

After the 2018 AFC U-23 Championship qualifiers, Manvir was called-up for the senior team for the 2017 Hero Tri-Nation Series, and made his debut against Mauritius in the opening match on 19 August 2017, which ended 2–1 to India. He was then selected for the squad to compete in the 2019 AFC Asian Cup qualifiers. A year later, Manvir was called-up for the squad to travel to Bangladesh for the 2018 SAFF Championship. He found his senior national debut goal in the competition against Maldives on 9 September 2018, where he scored the second goal and sealed the game 2–0 for India. India qualified for the semi-finals of the tournament, and played against arch-rivals Pakistan on 12 September, where Manvir scored a brace and helped India to progress through to final with the score of 3–1. India announced their squad for the 2019 King's Cup, where Manvir was included. He played only one match in the tournament, and that was against Thailand as a substitute for Balwant Singh on 8 June 2019, which ended in a 0–1 victory for India. Manvir was called-up for the senior squad to take part in the 2022 FIFA World Cup qualifiers, after his good form at FC Goa. He played his first qualifier match against Oman as a substitute for Ashique Kuruniyan on 5 September 2019, which ended in 1–2 defeat for India. He also appeared in the match against Qatar on 10 September, where India put on an excellent show, as they drew the continental champions 0–0 at full-time. Manvir found the net again in the friendly match against Oman on 25 March 2021, where he scored the equalizing goal, as it helped India to draw the match 1–1 after a strong second-half show.

Style of play 
Manvir is a forward. He is a skillful player, who likes to hold the ball and make use of the strength to hold off the opposition. His current coach at ATK Mohun Bagan, Antonio Habas, used him as a substitute player in beginning of the 2020–21 ISL season, who later deployed 4-3-3 and 4-4-2 formation to suit Manvir, after making a comment on the impact Manvir had on the pitch. He is considered as one of the most promising young forwards in the country.

Personal life 
Manvir was born in Duhre, Punjab in India on 6 November 1995. He went to Khalsa College before joining the Minerva Academy. His father Kuldip Singh played professional football, and had represented JCT FC, and had also took part in the Santosh Trophy for Punjab. Manvir has one sibling named Harkamal Singh.

Career statistics

Club

International

International goals
Scores and results list India's goal tally first

Honours

FC Goa
 Super Cup: 2019
 Indian Super League Premiers: 2019–20
 India Super League: 2018–19 (runner-up)

ATK Mohun Bagan
 Indian Super League: 2020–21 (runner-up)

India
 SAFF Championship: 2021; runner up: 2018
 Intercontinental Cup: 2017
 King's Cup third place: 2019

Others
 Santosh Trophy: 2016–17

References

External links 

 
 Manvir Singh at Indian Super League

Living people
1995 births
People from Jalandhar district
Indian footballers
Association football forwards
Footballers from Punjab, India
India international footballers
India youth international footballers
RoundGlass Punjab FC players
Mohammedan SC (Kolkata) players
Southern Samity players
FC Goa players
ATK Mohun Bagan FC players